Atong Atem is a Melbourne-based artist originally from South Sudan. She has had exhibitions at Melbourne's Immigration Museum, NGV's Triennial, Melbourne's winter arts festival Rising, Messum's Gallery (London), as well as works in Red Hook Labs (New York), Vogue Fashion Fair (Milan) and the Unseen Amsterdam art fair. She has been commissioned to adorn two facades of Hanover House on Melbourne's Southbank.

In 2021 she released Banksia, a video exploring African immigration to Australia.

References

21st-century Australian women artists
Living people
Year of birth missing (living people)
South Sudanese emigrants to Australia